Shutta is a northern suburb of Looe, Cornwall, England, United Kingdom.

References

Villages in Cornwall